Walking on Air or Walkin' on Air  may refer to:

 "Walking on Air" (Katy Perry song), 2013
 "Walking on Air" (Anise K song),  2012
 "Walking on Air" (Kerli song), 2008
 Walking on Air (1936 film), directed by Joseph Santley
 Walking on Air (1946 film), directed by Aveling Ginever
 Walkin' on Air, a 1987 album by Bobbysocks
 "Walking on Air", a song by Orchestral Manoeuvres in the Dark from the album Sugar Tax
 "Walking on Air", a 1995 song by King Crimson
 "Walking on Air", a song by the Bee Gees from This Is Where I Came In
 Walking on Air, a 2016 song by Radio Dept.
 "Sooner or Later (Walkin' on Air)", a song by the Moody Blues from Strange Times
 Walking on Air, American musical film starring Maudie Edwards

See also
 "Walking in the Air", a song from the 1982 animated film The Snowman